MV Ardingly was a coaster built in 1951 as a collier for Stephenson Clarke Shipping. She carried coal from North East England to ports in Southern England until this trade declined early in the 1960s. Stephenson Clarke then transferred her to carrying bulk cargoes including limestone and grain.

Many Stephenson Clarke ships were named after places in South East England. MV Ardingly may have been so named because one Stephenson Clarke director, Mr. P.G. Wallace, had been a pupil at Ardingly College in 1909.

In 1971 Stephenson Clarke sold her and a sister ship, MV Steyning, to John Kelly in Northern Ireland. Kelly renamed her MV Ballyrobert after the village of Ballyrobert in County Antrim.

In 1977 Kelly sold her to a Cypriot operator who renamed her MV Lucky Trader. She was sold for scrap and broken up in Piraeus near Athens 1982.

References

1950 ships
Ships built on the River Wear
Colliers
Merchant ships of the United Kingdom
Merchant ships of Cyprus